Beryl Prairie is a locality in the Peace River Country of British Columbia, Canada, located just northwest of the town of Hudson's Hope, between Portage and Brenot Creeks. It has about 300 people. It has agriculture, logging, and oil. It has its own water stand, and fire hall, with its own volunteer firefighters. It connects to the Farrell Creek Road, about 40 km up.

References

Unincorporated settlements in British Columbia
Peace River Country
Populated places in the Peace River Regional District